The Avče Pumped Storage Plant ( or ČHE Avče for short) is a pumped-storage power plant near the village of Avče in western Slovenia. The power plant was completed in June 2009 and it was put into commercial use in April 2010. The main building contractor was Primorje Ajdovščina. The powerplant is the first of its kind in Slovenia.

The reservoir is close to the village of Kanalski Vrh, and it holds a little over 2 million cubic meters of water. The generator generates  when producing electricity and uses  when pumping water. The same turbine is used for pumping and generating electricity.

The efficiency of the process is 77%, which means it is profitable to operate when the electricity generated costs 30% more. The reservoir has the capacity to operate for 15 hours at full power, and the discharge rate is around 40 cubic meters per second. Normally it will operate from 6 to 10 hours, usually filling the reservoir at the end of the week. The cost of the Avče pumped-storage plant was €122 million.

References 

Energy infrastructure completed in 2009
Pumped-storage hydroelectric power stations in Slovenia